Leprosy, also known as Hansen's disease (HD), is a long-term infection by the bacteria Mycobacterium leprae or Mycobacterium lepromatosis. Infection can lead to damage of the nerves, respiratory tract, skin, and eyes. This nerve damage may result in a lack of ability to feel pain, which can lead to the loss of parts of a person's extremities from repeated injuries or infection through unnoticed wounds. An infected person may also experience muscle weakness and poor eyesight. Leprosy symptoms may begin within one year, but, for some people, symptoms may take 20 years or more to occur.

Leprosy is spread between people, although extensive contact is necessary. Leprosy has a low pathogenicity, and  95% of people who contract M. leprae do not develop the disease. Spread is thought to occur through a cough or contact with fluid from the nose of a person infected by leprosy. Genetic factors and immune function play a role in how easily a person catches the disease. Leprosy does not spread during pregnancy to the unborn child or through sexual contact. Leprosy occurs more commonly among people living in poverty.  There are two main types of the disease – paucibacillary and multibacillary, which differ in the number of bacteria present. A person with paucibacillary disease has five or fewer poorly-pigmented, numb skin patches, while a person with multibacillary disease has more than five skin patches. The diagnosis is confirmed by finding acid-fast bacilli in a biopsy of the skin.

Leprosy is curable with multidrug therapy. Treatment of paucibacillary leprosy is with the medications dapsone, rifampicin, and clofazimine for six months. Treatment for multibacillary leprosy uses the same medications for 12 months. A number of other antibiotics may also be used. These treatments are provided free of charge by the World Health Organization.

Leprosy is not highly contagious. People with leprosy can live with their families and go to school and work. In the 1980s, there were 5.2 million cases globally but they went down to less than 0.2 million by 2020. Most new cases occur in 14 countries, with India accounting for more than half. In the 20 years from 1994 to 2014, 16 million people worldwide were cured of leprosy. About 200 cases per year are reported in the United States. Separating people affected by leprosy by placing them in leper colonies still occurs in some areas of India, China, the African continent, and Thailand.

Leprosy has affected humanity for thousands of years. Leprosy has historically been associated with social stigma, which continues to be a barrier to self-reporting and early treatment. Some consider the word leper offensive, preferring the phrase "person affected with leprosy". Leprosy is classified as a neglected tropical disease. World Leprosy Day was started in 1954 to draw awareness to those affected by leprosy.

Signs and symptoms 
Common symptoms present in the different types of leprosy include a runny nose; dry scalp; eye problems; skin lesions; muscle weakness; reddish skin; smooth, shiny, diffuse thickening of facial skin, ear, and hand; loss of sensation in fingers and toes; thickening of peripheral nerves; a flat nose from destruction of nasal cartilage; and changes in phonation and other aspects of speech production. In addition, atrophy of the testes and impotence may occur.

Leprosy can affect people in different ways. The average incubation period is five years. People may begin to notice symptoms within the first year or up to 20 years after infection. The first noticeable sign of leprosy is often the development of pale or pink coloured patches of skin that may be insensitive to temperature or pain. Patches of discolored skin are sometimes accompanied or preceded by nerve problems including numbness or tenderness in the hands or feet. Secondary infections (additional bacterial or viral infections) can result in tissue loss, causing fingers and toes to become shortened and deformed, as cartilage is absorbed into the body. A person's immune response differs depending on the form of leprosy.

Approximately 30% of people affected with leprosy experience nerve damage. The nerve damage sustained is reversible when treated early, but becomes permanent when appropriate treatment is delayed by several months. Damage to nerves may cause loss of muscle function, leading to paralysis. It may also lead to sensation abnormalities or numbness, which may lead to additional infections, ulcerations, and joint deformities.

Cause

M. leprae and M. lepromatosis 

M. leprae and M. lepromatosis are the mycobacteria that cause leprosy. M. lepromatosis is a relatively newly identified mycobacterium isolated from a fatal case of diffuse lepromatous leprosy in 2008. M. lepromatosis is indistinguishable clinically from M. leprae.

M. leprae is an intracellular, acid-fast bacterium that is aerobic and rod-shaped. M. leprae is surrounded by the waxy cell envelope coating characteristic of the genus Mycobacterium.

Genetically, M. leprae and M. lepromatosis lack the genes that are necessary for independent growth. M. leprae and M. lepromatosis are obligate intracellular pathogens, and cannot be grown (cultured) in the laboratory. The inability to culture M. leprae and M. lepromatosis has resulted in a difficulty definitively identifying the bacterial organism under a strict interpretation of Koch's postulates.

While the causative organisms have to date been impossible to culture in vitro, it has been possible to grow them in animals such as mice and armadillos.

Naturally occurring infection has been reported in nonhuman primates (including the African chimpanzee, the sooty mangabey, and the cynomolgus macaque), armadillos, and red squirrels. Multilocus sequence typing of the armadillo M. leprae strains suggests that they were of human origin for at most a few hundred years. Thus, it is suspected that armadillos first acquired the organism incidentally from early American explorers. This incidental transmission was sustained in the armadillo population, and it may be transmitted back to humans, making leprosy a zoonotic disease (spread between humans and animals).

Red squirrels (Sciurus vulgaris), a threatened species in Great Britain, were found to carry leprosy in November 2016. It has been suggested that the trade in red squirrel fur, highly prized in the medieval period and intensively traded, may have been responsible for the leprosy epidemic in medieval Europe. A pre-Norman era skull excavated in Hoxne, Suffolk, in 2017 was found to carry DNA from a strain of Mycobacterium leprae, which closely matched the strain carried by modern red squirrels on Brownsea Island, UK.

Risk factors 
The greatest risk factor for developing leprosy is contact with another person infected by leprosy. People who are exposed to a person who has leprosy are 5–8 times more likely to develop leprosy than members of the general population. Leprosy also occurs more commonly among those living in poverty. Not all people who are infected with M. leprae develop symptoms.

Conditions that reduce immune function, such as malnutrition, other illnesses, or genetic mutations, may increase the risk of developing leprosy. Infection with HIV does not appear to increase the risk of developing leprosy. Certain genetic factors in the person exposed have been associated with developing lepromatous or tuberculoid leprosy.

Transmission 
Transmission of leprosy occurs during close contact with those who are infected. Transmission of leprosy is through the upper respiratory tract. Older research suggested the skin as the main route of transmission, but recent research has increasingly favored the respiratory route. Transmission occurs through inhalation of bacilli present in upper airway secretion.

Leprosy is not sexually transmitted and is not spread through pregnancy to the unborn child. The majority (95%) of people who are exposed to M. leprae do not develop leprosy; casual contact such as shaking hands and sitting next to someone with leprosy does not lead to transmission. People are considered non-infectious 72 hours after starting appropriate multi-drug therapy.

Two exit routes of M. leprae from the human body often described are the skin and the nasal mucosa, although their relative importance is not clear. Lepromatous cases show large numbers of organisms deep in the dermis, but whether they reach the skin surface in sufficient numbers is doubtful.

Leprosy may also be transmitted to humans by armadillos, although the mechanism is not fully understood.

Genetics 
{| class="wikitable" style="float: right; margin-left:15px; text-align:center"
|-
! Name
! Locus
! OMIM
! Gene
|-
| LPRS1
| 10p13
| 
|
|-
| LPRS2
| 6q25
| 
| PARK2, PACRG
|-'

| LPRS3
| 4q32
| 
| TLR2|-
| LPRS4
| 6p21.3
| 
| LTA|-
| LPRS5
| 4p14
| 
| TLR1|-
| LPRS6
| 13q14.11
| 
|
|}
Not all people who are infected or exposed to M. leprae develop leprosy, and genetic factors are suspected to play a role in susceptibility to an infection. Cases of leprosy often cluster in families and several genetic variants have been identified. In many people who are exposed, the immune system is able to eliminate the leprosy bacteria during the early infection stage before severe symptoms develop. A genetic defect in cell-mediated immunity may cause a person to be susceptible to develop leprosy symptoms after exposure to the bacteria. The region of DNA responsible for this variability is also involved in Parkinson's disease, giving rise to current speculation that the two disorders may be linked at the biochemical level.

 Mechanism 
Most leprosy complications are the result of nerve damage. The nerve damage occurs from direct invasion by the M. leprae bacteria and a person's immune response resulting in inflammation. The molecular mechanism underlying how M. leprae produces the symptoms of leprosy is not clear, but M. leprae has been shown to bind to Schwann cells, which may lead to nerve injury including demyelination and a loss of nerve function (specifically a loss of axonal conductance). Numerous molecular mechanisms have been associated with this nerve damage including the presence of a laminin-binding protein and the glycoconjugate (PGL-1) on the surface of M. leprae that can bind to laminin on peripheral nerves.

As part of the human immune response, white blood cell-derived macrophages may engulf M. leprae by phagocytosis.

In the initial stages, small sensory and autonomic nerve fibers in the skin of a person with leprosy are damaged. This damage usually results in hair loss to the area, a loss of the ability to sweat, and numbness (decreased ability to detect sensations such as temperature and touch). Further peripheral nerve damage may result in skin dryness, more numbness, and muscle weaknesses or paralysis in the area affected. The skin can crack and if the skin injuries are not carefully cared for, there is a risk for a secondary infection that can lead to more severe damage.

 Diagnosis 

In countries where people are frequently infected, a person is considered to have leprosy if they have one of the following two signs:
 Skin lesion consistent with leprosy and with definite sensory loss.
 Positive skin smears.

Skin lesions can be single or many, and usually hypopigmented, although occasionally reddish or copper-colored. The lesions may be flat (macules), raised (papules), or solid elevated areas (nodular). Experiencing sensory loss at the skin lesion is a feature that can help determine if the lesion is caused by leprosy or by another disorder such as tinea versicolor. Thickened nerves are associated with leprosy and can be accompanied by loss of sensation or muscle weakness, but muscle weakness without the characteristic skin lesion and sensory loss is not considered a reliable sign of leprosy.

In some cases, acid-fast leprosy bacilli in skin smears are considered diagnostic; however, the diagnosis is typically made without laboratory tests, based on symptoms. If a person has a new leprosy diagnosis and already has a visible disability caused by leprosy, the diagnosis is considered late.

In countries or areas where leprosy is uncommon, such as the United States, diagnosis of leprosy is often delayed because healthcare providers are unaware of leprosy and its symptoms. Early diagnosis and treatment prevent nerve involvement, the hallmark of leprosy, and the disability it causes.U.S. Department of Health and Human Services, Health Resources and Services Administration. (n.d.). National Hansen's disease (leprosy) program Retrieved from 

There is no recommended test to diagnose latent leprosy in people without symptoms. Few people with latent leprosy test positive for anti PGL-1. The presence of M. leprae bacterial DNA can be identified using a polymerase chain reaction (PCR)-based technique. This molecular test alone is not sufficient to diagnose a person, but this approach may be used to identify someone who is at high risk of developing or transmitting leprosy such as those with few lesions or an atypical clinical presentation.

 Classification 
Several different approaches for classifying leprosy exist. There are similarities between the classification approaches.
 The World Health Organization system distinguishes "paucibacillary" and "multibacillary" based upon the proliferation of bacteria. ("pauci-" refers to a low quantity.)
 The Ridley-Jopling scale provides five gradations.
 The ICD-10, though developed by the WHO, uses Ridley-Jopling and not the WHO system. It also adds an indeterminate ("I") entry.
 In MeSH, three groupings are used.

Leprosy may also occur with only neural involvement, without skin lesions.

 Complications 
Leprosy may cause the victim to lose limbs and digits but not directly. M. leprae attacks nerve endings and destroys the body’s ability to feel pain and injury. Without feeling pain, people injure themselves on fire, thorns, rocks, and even hot coffee cups. Injuries become infected and result in tissue loss. Fingers, toes, and limbs become shortened and deformed as the tissue is absorbed into the body. 

 Prevention 
Early detection of the disease is important, since physical and neurological damage may be irreversible even if cured. Medications can decrease the risk of those living with people who have leprosy from acquiring the disease and likely those with whom people with leprosy come into contact outside the home. The WHO recommends that preventive medicine be given to people who are in close contact with someone who has leprosy. The suggested preventive treatment is a single dose of rifampicin (SDR) in adults and children over 2 years old who do not already have leprosy or tuberculosis. Preventive treatment is associated with a 57% reduction in infections within 2 years and a 30% reduction in infections within 6 years.

The Bacillus Calmette–Guérin (BCG) vaccine offers a variable amount of protection against leprosy in addition to its closely related target of tuberculosis. It appears to be 26% to 41% effective (based on controlled trials) and about 60% effective based on observational studies with two doses possibly working better than one. The WHO concluded in 2018 that the BCG vaccine at birth reduces leprosy risk and is recommended in countries with high incidence of TB and people who have leprosy. People living in the same home as a person with leprosy are suggested to take a BCG booster which may improve their immunity by 56%. Development of a more effective vaccine is ongoing.

A novel vaccine called LepVax entered clinical trials in 2017 with the first encouraging results reported on 24 participants published in 2020. If successful, this would be the first leprosy-specific vaccine available.

 Treatment 

Anti-leprosy medication
A number of leprostatic agents are available for treatment. A three-drug regimen of rifampicin, dapsone and clofazimine is recommended for all people with leprosy, for six months for paucibacillary leprosy and 12 months for multibacillary leprosy.

Multidrug therapy (MDT) remains highly effective, and people are no longer infectious after the first monthly dose. It is safe and easy to use under field conditions because of its presentation in calendar blister packs. Post-treatment relapse rates remain low. Resistance has been reported in several countries, although the number of cases is small. People with rifampicin-resistant leprosy may be treated with second line drugs such as fluoroquinolones, minocycline, or clarithromycin, but the treatment duration is 24 months because of their lower bactericidal activity. Evidence on the potential benefits and harms of alternative regimens for drug-resistant leprosy is not yet available.

Skin changes
For people with nerve damage, protective footwear may help prevent ulcers and secondary infection. Canvas shoes may be better than PVC boots. There may be no difference between double rocker shoes and below-knee plaster.

Topical ketanserin seems to have a better effect on ulcer healing than clioquinol cream or zinc paste, but the evidence for this is weak. Phenytoin applied to the skin improves skin changes to a greater degree when compared to saline dressings.

 Outcomes 
Although leprosy has been curable since the mid-20th century, left untreated it can cause permanent physical impairments and damage to a person's nerves, skin, eyes, and limbs.  Despite leprosy not being very infectious and having a low pathogenicity, there is still significant stigma and prejudice associated with the disease.  Because of this stigma, leprosy can affect a person's participation in social activities and may also affect the lives of their family and friends.  People with leprosy are also at a higher risk for problems with their mental well-being. The social stigma may contribute to problems obtaining employment, financial difficulties, and social isolation.  Efforts to reduce discrimination and reduce the stigma surrounding leprosy may help improve outcomes for people with leprosy.

 Epidemiology 

In 2018, there were 208,619 new cases of leprosy recorded, a slight decrease from 2017. In 2015, 94% of the new leprosy cases were confined to 14 countries. India reported the greatest number of new cases (60% of reported cases), followed by Brazil (13%) and Indonesia (8%). Although the number of cases worldwide continues to fall, there are parts of the world where leprosy is more common, including Brazil, South Asia (India, Nepal, Bhutan), some parts of Africa (Tanzania, Madagascar, Mozambique), and the western Pacific. About 150 to 250 cases are diagnosed in the United States each year.

In the 1960s, there were tens of millions of leprosy cases recorded when the bacteria started to develop resistance to dapsone, the most common treatment option at the time. International (e.g., the WHO's "Global Strategy for Reducing Disease Burden Due to Leprosy") and national (e.g., the International Federation of Anti-Leprosy Associations) initiatives have reduced the total number and the number of new cases of the disease.

 Disease burden 
The number of new leprosy cases is difficult to measure and monitor because of leprosy's long incubation period, delays in diagnosis after onset of the disease, and lack of medical care in affected areas. The registered prevalence of the disease is used to determine disease burden. Registered prevalence is a useful proxy indicator of the disease burden, as it reflects the number of active leprosy cases diagnosed with the disease and receiving treatment with MDT at a given point in time. The prevalence rate is defined as the number of cases registered for MDT treatment among the population in which the cases have occurred, again at a given point in time.

 History 

 Historical distribution 
Using comparative genomics, in 2005, geneticists traced the origins and worldwide distribution of leprosy from East Africa or the Near East along human migration routes. They found four strains of M. leprae with specific regional locations:  Monot et al. (2005) determined that leprosy originated in East Africa or the Near East and traveled with humans along their migration routes, including those of trade in goods and slaves. The four strains of M. leprae are based in specific geographic regions where each predominantly occurs:
 strain 1 in Asia, the Pacific region, and East Africa; 
 strain 2 in Ethiopia, Malawi, Nepal, north India, and New Caledonia;
 strain 3 in Europe, North Africa, and the Americas;
 strain 4 in West Africa and the Caribbean.

This confirms the spread of the disease along the migration, colonisation, and slave trade routes taken from East Africa to India, West Africa to the New World, and from Africa into Europe and vice versa.

Skeletal remains discovered in 2009 represent the oldest documented evidence for leprosy, dating to the 2nd millennium BC.  Located at Balathal, Rajasthan, in northwest India, the discoverers suggest that, if the disease did migrate from Africa to India during the 3rd millennium BC "at a time when there was substantial interaction among the Indus Civilization, Mesopotamia, and Egypt, there needs to be additional skeletal and molecular evidence of leprosy in India and Africa to confirm the African origin of the disease." A proven human case was verified by DNA taken from the shrouded remains of a man discovered by researchers from the Hebrew University of Jerusalem in a tomb next to the Old City of Jerusalem, Israel, dated by radiocarbon methods to the first half of the 1st century.

The oldest strains of leprosy known from Europe are from Great Chesterford in southeast England and dating back to AD 415–545. These findings suggest a different path for the spread of leprosy, meaning it may have originated in Western Eurasia. This study also indicates that there were more strains in Europe at the time than previously determined.

 Discovery and scientific progress 
Literary attestation of leprosy is unclear because of the ambiguity of many early sources, including the Indian Atharvaveda and Kausika Sutra, the Egyptian Ebers papyrus, and the Hebrew Bible's various sections regarding signs of impurity (tzaraath). Clearly leprotic symptoms are attested in the Indian doctor Sushruta's Compendium, originally dating to c. 600 BC but only surviving in emended texts no earlier than the 5th century. They were separately described by Hippocrates in 460 BC. However, Hansen's disease probably did not exist in Greece or the Middle East before the Common Era. In 1846, Francis Adams produced The Seven Books of Paulus Aegineta which included a commentary on all medical and surgical knowledge and descriptions and remedies to do with leprosy from the Romans, Greeks, and Arabs.Roman: Celsus, Pliny, Serenus Samonicus, Scribonius Largus, Caelius Aurelianus, Themison, Octavius Horatianus, Marcellus the Emperic; Greek: Aretaeus, Plutarch, Galen, Oribasius, Aetius, Actuarius, Nonnus, Psellus, Leo, Myrepsus; Arabic: Scrapion, Avenzoar, Albucasis, the Haly Abbas translated by Stephanus Antiochensis, Alsharavius, Rhases, and Guido de Cauliaco.

Leprosy did not exist in the Americas before colonization by modern Europeans nor did it exist in Polynesia until the middle of the 19th century.

The causative agent of leprosy, M. leprae, was discovered by G. H. Armauer Hansen in Norway in 1873, making it the first bacterium to be identified as causing disease in humans.

 Treatment 
The first effective treatment (promin) became available in the 1940s. In the 1950s, dapsone was introduced. The search for further effective antileprosy drugs led to the use of clofazimine and rifampicin in the 1960s and 1970s. Later, Indian scientist Shantaram Yawalkar and his colleagues formulated a combined therapy using rifampicin and dapsone, intended to mitigate bacterial resistance. Multi-drug therapy (MDT) combining all three drugs was first recommended by the WHO in 1981. These three antileprosy drugs are still used in the standard MDT regimens.

Leprosy was once believed to be highly contagious and was treated with mercury, as was syphilis, which was first described in 1530. Many early cases thought to be leprosy could actually have been syphilis.

Resistance has developed to initial treatment. Until the introduction of MDT in the early 1980s, leprosy could not be diagnosed and treated successfully within the community.

Japan still has sanatoriums (although Japan's sanatoriums no longer have active leprosy cases, nor are survivors held in them by law).

The importance of the nasal mucosa in the transmission of M leprae was recognized as early as 1898 by Schäffer, in particular, that of the ulcerated mucosa. The mechanism of plantar ulceration in leprosy and its treatment was first described by Dr Ernest W Price.

 Etymology 
The word "leprosy" comes from the Greek word "λέπος (lépos) – skin" and "λεπερός (leperós) – scaly man".

 Society and culture 

 India 

British India enacted the Leprosy Act of 1898 which institutionalized those affected and segregated them by sex to prevent reproduction.  The act was difficult to enforce but was repealed in 1983 only after multidrug therapy had become widely available.  In 1983, the National Leprosy Elimination Programme, previously the National Leprosy Control Programme, changed its methods from surveillance to the treatment of people with leprosy.  India still accounts for over half of the global disease burden. According to WHO, new cases in India during 2019 diminished to 114,451 patients (57% of the world's total new cases).
Until 2019, one could justify a petition for divorce with the spouse's diagnosis of leprosy.

 Treatment cost 
Between 1995 and 1999, the WHO, with the aid of the Nippon Foundation, supplied all endemic countries with free multidrug therapy in blister packs, channeled through ministries of health. This free provision was extended in 2000 and again in 2005, 2010 and 2015 with donations by the multidrug therapy manufacturer Novartis through the WHO. In the latest agreement signed between the company and the WHO in October 2015, the provision of free multidrug therapy by the WHO to all endemic countries will run until the end of 2025. At the national level, nongovernment organizations affiliated with the national program will continue to be provided with an appropriate free supply of multidrug therapy by the WHO.

 Historical texts 
Written accounts of leprosy date back thousands of years. Various skin diseases translated as leprosy appear in the ancient Indian text, the Atharava Veda, by 600 BC. Another Indian text, the Manusmriti (200 BC),  prohibited contact with those infected with the disease and made marriage to a person infected with leprosy punishable.

The Hebraic root tsara or tsaraath (צָרַע, – tsaw-rah' – to be struck with leprosy, to be leprous) and the Greek (λεπρός–lepros), are of broader classification than the more narrow use of the term related to Hansen's Disease. Any progressive skin disease (a whitening or splotchy bleaching of the skin, raised manifestations of scales, scabs, infections, rashes, etc....), as well as generalized molds and surface discoloration of any clothing, leather, or discoloration on walls or surfaces throughout homes all, came under the "law of leprosy" (Leviticus 14:54–57). Ancient sources such as the Talmud (Sifra 63) make clear that tzaraath refers to various types of lesions or stains associated with ritual impurity and occurring on cloth, leather, or houses, as well as skin.  Traditional Judaism and Jewish rabbinical authorities, both historical and modern, emphasize that the tsaraath of Leviticus is a spiritual ailment with no direct relationship to Hansen's disease or physical contagions.  The relation of tsaraath to "leprosy" comes from translations of Hebrew Biblical texts into Greek and ensuing misconceptions.

All three Synoptic Gospels of the New Testament describe instances of Jesus healing people with leprosy (Matthew 8:1–4, Mark 1:40–45, and Luke 5:12–16). The Bible's description of leprosy is congruous (if lacking detail) with the symptoms of modern leprosy, but the relationship between this disease, tzaraath, and Hansen's disease has been disputed. The biblical perception that people with leprosy were unclean can be found in a passage from Leviticus 13: 44–46. While this text defines the leper as impure, it did not explicitly make a moral judgement on those with leprosy. Some Early Christians believed that those affected by leprosy were being punished by God for sinful behavior.  Moral associations have persisted throughout history. Pope Gregory the Great (540–604) and Isidor of Seville (560–636) considered people with the disease to be heretics.

 Middle Ages 

The social perception of leprosy in the general population was in general mixed. On one hand, people feared getting infected with the disease and thought of people suspected of leprosy to be unclean, untrustworthy, and occasionally morally corrupt. On the other hand, Jesus' interaction with lepers, the writing of church leaders and the Christian focus on charitable works led to viewing the lepers as "chosen by God" or seeing the disease as a means of obtaining access to heaven.

Early medieval understanding of leprosy was influenced by early Christian writers such as Gregory of Nazianzus and John Chrysostom, whose writings were later embraced 
by Byzantine and Latin writers. Gregory, for example, did not only compose sermons urging Christians to assist victims of the disease, but also condemned pagans or Christians who justified rejecting lepers on the allegation that God had sent them the disease to punish them. As cases of leprosy increased during these years in the Eastern Roman Empire, becoming a major health issue, the ecclesiastic leaders of the time discussed how to assist those affected as well as change the attitude of society towards them. They also tried this by using the name "Holy disease" instead of the commonly used "Elephant's disease" (elephantiasis), implying that God did not create this disease to punish people but to purify them for heaven. Although not always successful in persuading the public and a cure was never found by Greek medicians, they created an environment where victims could get palliative care and were never expressly banned from society, as sometimes happened in Western Europe. Theodore Balsamon, a 12th century jurist in Constantinople, noted that lepers were allowed to enter the same churches, cities and assemblies that healthy people attended.

As the disease became more prevalent in Western Europe in the fifth century, first efforts to set up permanent institutions to house and feed lepers. These efforts were, inclusively, the work of bishops in France at the end of the sixth century, such as in Chalon-sur-Saône. The increase in hospitals or leprosaria (sing. leprosarium) that treated people with leprosy in the 12th and 13th century seems to indicate a rise in cases, possibly in connection with the increase in urbanification  as well as returning crusaders from the Middle East. France alone had nearly 2,000 leprosaria during this period. Additionally to the new leprosia, further steps were taken by secular and religious leaders to prevent further spread of the disease. The third Lateran Council of 1179 required lepers to have their own priests and churches and a 1346 edict by King Edward expelled lepers from city limits. Segregation from mainstream society became common, and people with leprosy were often required to wear clothing that identified them as such or carry a bell announcing their presence. As in the East, it was the Church who took care of the lepers due to the still persisting moral stigma and who ran the leprosaria. Although the leprosaria in Western Europe removed the sick from society, they were never a place to quarantine them or from which they could not leave: lepers would go beg for alms for the upkeep of the leprosaria or meet with their families.

 19th century 

 Norway 
Norway was the location of a progressive stance on leprosy tracking and treatment and played an influential role in European understanding of the disease. In 1832, Dr. JJ Hjort conducted the first leprosy survey, thus establishing a basis for epidemiological surveys. Subsequent surveys resulted in the establishment of a national leprosy registry to study the causes of leprosy and for tracking the rate of infection.

Early leprosy research throughout Europe was conducted by Norwegian scientists Daniel Cornelius Danielssen and Carl Wilhelm Boeck. Their work resulted in the establishment of the National Leprosy Research and Treatment Center. Danielssen and Boeck believed the cause of leprosy transmission was hereditary. This stance was influential in advocating for the isolation of those infected by sex to prevent reproduction.

 Colonialism and imperialism 

Though leprosy in Europe was again on the decline by the 1860s, Western countries embraced isolation treatment out of fear of the spread of disease from developing countries, minimal understanding of bacteriology, lack of diagnostic ability or knowledge of how contagious the disease was, and missionary activity.  Growing imperialism and pressures of the industrial revolution resulted in a Western presence in countries where leprosy was endemic, namely the British presence in India.  Isolation treatment methods were observed by Surgeon-Mayor Henry Vandyke Carter of the British Colony in India while visiting Norway, and these methods were applied in India with the financial and logistical assistance of religious missionaries.  Colonial and religious influence and associated stigma continued to be a major factor in the treatment and public perception of leprosy in endemic developing countries until the mid-twentieth century.

 20th century 

 United States 
The National Leprosarium at Carville, Louisiana, known in 1955 as the Louisiana Leper Home, was the only leprosy hospital on the mainland United States. Leprosy patients from all over the United States were sent to Carville in order to be kept in isolation away from the public, as not much about leprosy transmission was known at the time and stigma against those with leprosy was high (see Leprosy stigma). The Carville leprosarium was known for its innovations in reconstructive surgery for those with leprosy. In 1941, 22 patients at Carville underwent trials for a new drug called promin. The results were described as miraculous, and soon after the success of promin came dapsone, a medicine even more effective in the fight against leprosy.

 Stigma 

Despite now effective treatment and education efforts, leprosy stigma continues to be problematic in developing countries where the disease is common. Leprosy is most common amongst impoverished populations where social stigma is likely to be compounded by poverty. Fears of ostracism, loss of employment, or expulsion from family and society may contribute to a delayed diagnosis and treatment.

Folk beliefs, lack of education, and religious connotations of the disease continue to influence social perceptions of those affected in many parts of the world. In Brazil, for example, folklore holds that leprosy is a disease transmitted by dogs, or that it is associated with sexual promiscuity, or that it is a punishment for sins or moral transgressions (distinct from other diseases and misfortunes, which are in general thought of as being according to the will of God). Socioeconomic factors also have a direct impact. Lower-class domestic workers who are often employed by those in a higher socioeconomic class may find their employment in jeopardy as physical manifestations of the disease become apparent. Skin discoloration and darker pigmentation resulting from the disease also have social repercussions.

In extreme cases in northern India, leprosy is equated with an "untouchable" status that "often persists long after individuals with leprosy have been cured of the disease, creating lifelong prospects of divorce, eviction, loss of employment, and ostracism from family and social networks."

 Public policy 
A goal of the World Health Organization is to "eliminate leprosy" and in 2016 the organization launched "Global Leprosy Strategy 2016–2020: Accelerating towards a leprosy-free world". Elimination of leprosy is defined as "reducing the proportion of leprosy patients in the community to very low levels, specifically to below one case per 10,000 population". Diagnosis and treatment with multidrug therapy are effective, and a 45% decline in disease burden has occurred since multidrug therapy has become more widely available. The organization emphasizes the importance of fully integrating leprosy treatment into public health services, effective diagnosis and treatment, and access to information. The approach includes supporting an increase in health care professionals who understand the disease, and a coordinated and renewed political commitment that includes coordination between countries and improvements in the methodology for collecting and analysing data.

Interventions in the "Global Leprosy Strategy 2016–2020: Accelerating towards a leprosy-free world":
 Early detection of cases focusing on children to reduce transmission and disabilities. 
 Enhanced healthcare services and improved access for people who may be marginalized. 
 For countries where leprosy is endemic, further interventions include an improved screening of close contacts, improved treatment regimens, and interventions to reduce stigma and discrimination against people who have leprosy.

 Community-based interventions 
In some instances in India, community-based rehabilitation is embraced by local governments and NGOs alike. Often, the identity cultivated by a community environment is preferable to reintegration, and models of self-management and collective agency independent of NGOs and government support have been desirable and successful.

Notable cases
 Josephine Cafrine of Seychelles had leprosy from the age of 12 and kept a personal journal that documented her struggles and suffering. It was published as an autobiography in 1923.
 Saint Damien De Veuster, a Roman Catholic priest from Belgium, himself eventually contracting leprosy, ministered to lepers who had been placed under a government-sanctioned medical quarantine on the island of Molokai in the Kingdom of Hawaii.
 Baldwin IV of Jerusalem was a Christian king of Latin Jerusalem who had leprosy.
Josefina Guerrero was a Filipino spy during World War II, who used the Japanese fear of her leprosy to listen to their battle plans and deliver the information to the American forces under Douglas MacArthur.
 King Henry IV of England (reigned 1399 to 1413) possibly had leprosy.
 Vietnamese poet Hàn Mặc Tử
 Ōtani Yoshitsugu, a Japanese daimyōLeprosy in the media
 English author Graham Greene's novel A Burnt-Out Case is set in a leper colony in Belgian Congo. The story is also predominantly about a disillusioned architect working with a doctor on devising new cure and amenities for mutilated victims of lepers; the title, too, refers to the condition of mutilation and disfigurement in the disease.
Death metal band Death (metal band) has an album titled “Leprosy”.
 Forugh Farrokhzad made a 22-minute documentary about a leprosy colony in Iran in 1962 titled The House Is Black. The film humanizes the people affected and opens by saying that "there is no shortage of ugliness in the world, but by closing our eyes on ugliness, we will intensify it."
Moloka'i is a novel by Alan Brennert about a leper colony in Hawaii. This novel follows the story of a seven-year-old girl taken from her family and put on the small Hawaiian island of Molokai's leper settlement. Even though this is a fiction novel it is based upon some very true and revealing incidents which occurred at this Leprosy settlement.
Jack London in 1909 published Koolau the Leper in his Tales of Hawai'i about Molokai and people consigned to it circa 1893.
 The lead character in The Chronicles of Thomas Covenant by Stephen R. Donaldson suffers from leprosy. His condition seems to be cured by the magic of the fantasy land he finds himself in, but he resists believing in its reality, for example, by continuing to perform a regular visual surveillance of extremities as a safety check. Donaldson gained experience with the disease as a young man in India, where his father worked in a missionary for people with leprosy.
 In House of the Dragon, the TV adaptation of George R. R. Martin's Fire and Blood, King Viserys I Targaryen suffers from a debilitating disease where parts of his body develop lesions and slowly rot away over time. Paddy Considine, the actor playing the role, explained on a podcast with Entertainment Weekly that Viserys suffers from "a form of leprosy". Leprosy is not mentioned in the novel, where Viserys instead suffers from various health issues relating to his obesity, including infections and gout.

 Infection of animals 
Wild nine-banded armadillos (Dasypus novemcinctus) in south central United States often carry Mycobacterium leprae. This is believed to be because armadillos have a low body temperature. Leprosy lesions appear mainly in cooler body regions such as the skin and mucous membranes of the upper respiratory tract. Because of armadillos' armor, skin lesions are hard to see. Abrasions around the eyes, nose and feet are the most common signs. Infected armadillos make up a large reservoir of M. leprae and may be a source of infection for some humans in the United States or other locations in the armadillos' home range.  In armadillo leprosy, lesions do not persist at the site of entry in animals, M. leprae multiply in macrophages at the site of inoculation and lymph nodes.

A recent outbreak in chimpanzees in West Africa is showing that the bacteria can infect another species and also possibly have additional rodent hosts.

Recent studies have demonstrated that the disease is endemic in the UK red Eurasian squirrel population, with Mycobacterium leprae and Mycobacterium lepromatosis appearing in different populations. The Mycobacteria leprae'' strain discovered on Brownsea Island is equated to one thought to have died out in the human population in mediaeval times.  Despite this, and speculation regarding past transmission through trade in squirrel furs, there does not seem to be a high risk of squirrel to human transmission from the wild population. Although Leprosy continues to be diagnosed in immigrants to the UK, the last known human case of leprosy arising in the UK was recorded over 200 years ago.

It has been shown that leprosy can reprogram cells in mouse and armadillos models similarly as how Induced pluripotent stem cells are generated by the transcription factors Myc, Oct3/4, Sox2 and Klf4.

See also 
 Leper Colony
 Alice Ball
 Maurice Born
 Kate Marsden

References

Further reading

External links 

 
 Links and resources to information about leprosy selected by the World Health Organization

 
Bacterial diseases
Tropical diseases
Wikipedia infectious disease articles ready to translate
Wikipedia medicine articles ready to translate
Hansens's disease